Awaargi is a 1990 Indian Hindi-language drama film directed by Mahesh Bhatt starring Anil Kapoor, Govinda, Meenakshi Sheshadri in lead roles. Over the years it has gained critical praise and is considered a classic now. 
Govinda received critical acclaim for his role.

Story
Lala Jamal Khan (Anupam Kher) is one of the underground dons in Bombay and has several men to carry out all kinds of criminal activities for him. One of them is Azaad (Anil Kapoor), who he uses to scare people and Azaad has never failed him. Then Azaad goes and rescues a prostitute named Meena (Meenakshi Sheshadri) from Ranu Bhai (Avtar Gill), who owes allegiance to rival don, Bhau (Paresh Rawal) and invites his ire and anger. Azaad refuses to submit to anyone and assists Meena meet her goal, which is to be a famous singer. He entrusts her to a music director by the name of Dhirendra (Govinda) and sits back and watches as Meena becomes popular day by day. Azaad has fallen in love with Meena but is unable to tell this. What Azaad does not know is that Dhirendra too has fallen in love with Meena and it appears that Meena is also attracted to him. Before Azaad can pursue this any further, he must contend with Bhau's hoodlums, who have been instructed to kill him under any circumstances.

Cast
Anil Kapoor as Azaad
Govinda as Dheerendra Kumar "Dheeren"
Meenakshi Sheshadri as Meena 
Anupam Kher as Lala Jamal Khan 
Paresh Rawal as Bhau 
Satish Kaushik as Azaad's Friend
Avtar Gill as Ranu Bhai 
Ghulam Ali as himself (Special Appearance)

Music
The music of Awaargi was by Anu Malik. The lyrics were penned by Anand Bakshi. The album is known for the ghazal "Chamakte Chand Ko Toota Hua Tara Bana Dala" sung by Ghulam Ali.

References

External links 
 

1990s Hindi-language films
1990 films
1990 drama films
Films directed by Mahesh Bhatt
Films scored by Anu Malik
Indian drama films
Hindi-language drama films